Riaz Afridi (born 21 January 1985) is a Pakistani cricket coach and cricketer.

He was a right-handed batsman and a right-arm medium-fast bowler. In December 2017, his youngest brother Shaheen Afridi was named in Pakistan's squad for the 2018 Under-19 Cricket World Cup.

Afridi has played one Test match, for the Pakistan national cricket team against the Sri Lanka national cricket team. It was the same match which saw Naved-ul-Hasan make his Test debut.

Riaz is a cousin of Pakistani footballer Yasir Afridi. In 2007 Riaz signed a contract with the Indian Cricket League (ICL) and represented the Lahore Badshahs, which put Riaz's future as a Pakistani Test player at risk. During the summer months Riaz plays for Great Ayton CC in the NYSD league in the north east of England where he has helped them win the league and consistently finished top wicket taker in the league with his fast swing bowling and big hitting.

References

1985 births
Living people
Khyber Pakhtunkhwa cricketers
Pakistan Test cricketers
Peshawar cricketers
ICL Pakistan XI cricketers
Lahore Badshahs cricketers
Pakistani cricketers
Zarai Taraqiati Bank Limited cricketers
Peshawar Panthers cricketers
Pakistan Telecommunication Company Limited cricketers
Cricketers from Peshawar
Afridi people
Pakistani cricket coaches